Joseph Sherman Frelinghuysen Sr. (March 12, 1869 – February 8, 1948) represented New Jersey as a Republican in the United States Senate from 1917 to 1923.

Early life and family 
He was born in Raritan, New Jersey, on March 12, 1869, to Frederick Frelinghuysen (1818-1891) and Victoria Bowen (1830-1914). His father was a lawyer who studied under Richard Stockton Field. He came from a historic New Jersey political family. His paternal grandparents were John Frederick Frelinghuysen (1776–1833), a lawyer and brigadier general in the War of 1812, and his second wife, Elizabeth Mercereau Van Vechten. His great-grandparents were Frederick Theodore Frelinghuysen (1753-1804), lawyer, soldier, and Senator from New Jersey, and his first wife, Gertrude Schenck (1752/53-1794).

Career
After fighting in the Spanish–American War and starting an insurance business, Frelinghuysen was elected to the state Senate in 1905 and became president of that body in 1909. He held several statewide offices before being elected to the U.S. Senate in 1916. He was New Jersey's first directly elected senator following ratification of the 17th Amendment to the Constitution in 1913. While in the Senate, he frequented the Chevy Chase Club and would often golf with his fellow Senators Warren G. Harding, Stephen B. Elkins, and Eugene Hale.

In 1921, President Warren G. Harding signed the Knox–Porter Resolution, officially ending America's involvement in World War I at Frelinghuysen's estate in Raritan, New Jersey. The President stayed on the estate until at least July 4. After a failed reelection bid in 1922, Frelinghuysen returned to the insurance business.

In 1938, after considering a run for one of the United States Senate seats in New Jersey, Frelinghuysen declined to run.  Instead, he put his support behind fellow Republican, former Senator W. Warren Barbour, for the Republican nomination. Barbour eventually won the Senate seat and served until his death in 1943.

Personal life
Frelinghuysen married Emily Macy Brewster. Together they had three children:
Victoria Frelinghuysen (1907–2002), who married John Grenville Bates Jr.
Emily Frelinghuysen, who married H. Edward Bilkey until his death in 1950 and later married Dr. Ross A. McFarland of the Harvard School of Public Health.
Joseph S. Frelinghuysen Jr. (1912–2005), who married Emily Lawrance (1911-2004), the daughter of Charles Lawrance (1882–1950) and Emily Margaret Gordon Dix, and the granddaughter of Rev. Morgan Dix (1827–1908), the rector of Trinity Parish.
His wife's portrait and that of Joseph Jr, were painted in 1916 by the Swiss-born American artist Adolfo Müller-Ury; it is today in the Newark Museum, New Jersey.  Frelinghuysen owned an 88-foot houseboat called Victoria that Harding used for 12 days after he won the 1920 election for President, but before he was inaugurated in March 1921.

He died on February 8, 1948, in Tucson, Arizona, and was interred at St. Bernard's Cemetery in Bernardsville, New Jersey.

Legacy 

A memorial plaque was placed on the estate grounds commemorating the Knox–Porter Resolution officially ending America's involvement in World War I. Today the estate is long gone and suburban sprawl has replaced it with mini-malls. The marker remains in a patch of grass near a Burger King parking lot along Route 28, just north of the Somerville traffic circle.

References

External links 

 Barbour, Thomas (nephew of William Warren Barbour). Our Families (Volumes 1 & 2). Self-printed. 1983
 Hess, Stephen. America's Political Dynasties: From Adams to Clinton. Brookings Institution Press, Nov 24, 2015
Joseph Sherman Frelinghuysen Sr. at Findagrave

1869 births
1948 deaths
Republican Party New Jersey state senators
Frelinghuysen family
Republican Party United States senators from New Jersey
American people of Dutch descent
Raritan, New Jersey
People from Raritan, New Jersey
Presidents of the New Jersey Senate
Military personnel from New Jersey
American military personnel of the Spanish–American War
20th-century American politicians